Khosrowabad (also Romanized as Khosrowābād; also known as Husruābād and Khusruabad) is a village in Gurab Pas Rural District, in the Central District of Fuman County, Gilan Province, Iran. At the 2006 census, its population was 621, in 168 families.

References 

Populated places in Fuman County